Paris Sonata (Simplified Chinese: 巴黎恋歌; Traditional Chinese: 巴黎戀歌) is a 2006 Chinese television series starring Ruby Lin, Ren Quan and Leanne Liu in the lead roles, and it premiered on Guangdong Television on July 2, 2006.

Cast
 Ruby Lin as Yu Manzhi
 Ren Quan as Ji Wei
 Leanne Liu as He Yutong
 Shaun Tam as Ren Yunkuan
 Zheng Xiao Ning as Yu Chongtian
 Yan Qing Yu as Wang Qian
 Liu Tao as Yu Yue
 Ding Wen Qi as Liang Qingxuan
 Ren Xiao Fei as Qiu Xiaowei
 Li Ming as Ji Kai

Production
Filming started on April 18, 2005 at Shanghai's Lu Xun park, and ended July, 2005.

Soundtrack
 Opening theme song:  Sunset Waiting(日落等待日出) for Sunrise by Calvin Liu
 Sub Theme song:  If There Is No You(若沒有你) by Kiki Ding
 Sub Theme song:  Angel Don't Cry(天使別哭) by Ruby Lin

References

External links 
 Paris Sonata Sohu website 
 Paris Sonata Sina website 

2006 Chinese television series debuts
2006 Chinese television series endings
Chinese romance television series
Mandarin-language television shows
Guangdong Television original programming